The 2014–15 Furman Paladins men's basketball team represented Furman University during the 2014–15 NCAA Division I men's basketball season. The Paladins, led by second year head coach Niko Medved, played their home games at Timmons Arena and were members of the Southern Conference.

After going just 5–13 in conference play to finish in last place, the Paladins won three games in the Southern Conference tournament before losing by 3 points in the finals to top-seeded Wofford. The team finished the season 11–22 overall.

Roster

Schedule

|-
!colspan=9 style="background:#6B3FA0; color:#FFFFFF;"| Exhibition

|-
!colspan=9 style="background:#6B3FA0; color:#FFFFFF;"| Regular season

|-
!colspan=9 style="background:#6B3FA0; color:#FFFFFF;"| SoCon tournament

References

Furman Paladins men's basketball seasons
Furman
Furman Paladins men's bask
Furman Paladins men's bask